2018 Maryland Senate election
2018 Maryland House of Delegates election